Jules-Émile Saintin (14 August 1829 – 13 July 1894)  was a neoclassic French painter.

Biography
He was born in Lemé (France). Jules Émile Saintin was a pupil of Michel Martin Drolling and François-Édouard Picot at the Ecole des Beaux-Arts in Paris in 1845. He exhibited pencil portraits at the Salon des artistes français (Salon of French Artists) in 1850 and in 1853.

In April 1854, he went to live and work in the United States, where he painted portraits, landscapes and Indian subjects.

He returned to Paris in 1860 and developed a workshop where he made paintings with American themes, and genre scenes.

In 1876, he was appointed Commissioner of the Centennial Exposition in Philadelphia.

Jules Émile Saintin was a friend of the architect Charles Garnier and the painter Paul Baudry.

He was appointed a Chevalier (Knight) of the Legion of Honour in 1877.

Works
John C. Breckenridge, Vice President of the United States
The Pony Express (1863)
The Small War, Portrait of M. V. Giraud and Mlle. de Sade (1865)
The Path to War (1865), Musée de la Crèche, Chaumont, Haute-Marne
Carmella, Marthe, Portrait of Princess Mathilde and Mlle. Edile Riquier (1866)
Portraits of Mlle. Jouassain and Émilie  Dubois (1868)
Indecision, Deception (1870)
First Engagement, Self Satisfied (1877)
Émilienne  (1879)
Flowers of Nice, Abandon (1880)
At Tuileries, Near the Sea (1882)
Autumn Night (1997)
Brumaire, La Roche-aux-Mouettes (1888)

References

19th-century French painters
French male painters
1829 births
1894 deaths
Painters from Paris
École des Beaux-Arts alumni
Members of the Académie des beaux-arts
Chevaliers of the Légion d'honneur
19th-century French male artists